The 2022 Kilkenny Senior Hurling Championship was the 128th staging of the Kilkenny Senior Hurling Championship since its establishment by the Kilkenny County Board in 1887. The championship ran from 17 September to 16 October 2022.

Ballyhale Shamrocks entered the championship as the defending champions and will be hoping to secure a fifth consecutive title.

The final was played on 16 October 2022 at UPMC Nowlan Park in Kilkenny, between Ballyhale Shamrocks and James Stephens, in what was their first meeting in the final in three years. Ballyhale Shamrocks won the match by 1-21 to 2-11 to claim a record-equalling 20th championship title overall and a record-breaking fifth successive title.

Niall Brassil was the championship's top scorer with 0-41.

Team changes

To Championship

Promoted from the Kilkenny Intermediate Hurling Championship
Glenmore

From Championship

Relegated to the Kilkenny Intermediate Hurling Championship
 Rower-Inistioge

Results

First round

Relegation playoff

Quarter-finals

Semi-finals

Final

Championship statistics

Top scorers

Overall

In a single game

Miscellaneous

 Glenmore's first round game against Ballyhale Shamrocks was the club's first senior game in 17 years.

References

External links
 Kilkenny GAA website

Kilkenny Senior Hurling Championship
Kilkenny Senior Hurling Championship
Kilkenny Senior Hurling Championship